Psycharium is a genus of moths in the Somabrachyidae family.

Species
Psycharium barnardi Geertsema, 1998
Psycharium kammanassiense Geertsema, 1998
Psycharium montanum Geertsema, 1998
Psycharium natalense Geertsema, 1998
Psycharium pellucens Herrich-Schäffer, 1856

References

Zygaenoidea
Zygaenoidea genera